The Kossou Dam is an embankment dam that impounds the Bandama River about  northwest of Yamoussoukro in  Côte d'Ivoire. The dam impounds the largest lake in Côte d'Ivoire, Lake Kossou.

References

Dams completed in 1972
Energy infrastructure completed in 1972
Kossou
Hydroelectric power stations in Ivory Coast
Embankment dams
Buildings and structures in Yamoussoukro
1972 establishments in Ivory Coast